Indian Creek is a stream in Butler County in the U.S. state of Missouri. It is a tributary of Black River.

Indian Creek most likely was named for the Indians who settled along its course.

See also
List of rivers of Missouri

References

Rivers of Butler County, Missouri
Rivers of Missouri